Diakonoffiana is a genus of moths belonging to the subfamily Olethreutinae of the family Tortricidae.

Species
Diakonoffiana cyanitis (Diakonoff, 1973)
Diakonoffiana cyanosticha (Clarke, 1976)
Diakonoffiana mataea (Diakonoff, 1973)
Diakonoffiana saloris (Diakonoff, 1973)
Diakonoffiana spumans (Diakonoff, 1973)
Diakonoffiana syngena (Diakonoff, 1973)
Diakonoffiana tricolorana (Meyrick, 1881)
Diakonoffiana vindemians (Meyrick, 1921)

See also
List of Tortricidae genera

References

External links
tortricidae.com

Olethreutini
Tortricidae genera